Robert E. Behnke (April 7, 1932 in Milwaukee, Wisconsin – March 26, 1999), was a member of the Wisconsin State Assembly. He graduated from high school in Wautoma, Wisconsin. Robert Behnke died on March 26, 1999 and is buried in Brushville, Wisconsin. He was married with five children.

Career
Behnke was a Democratic member of the Assembly from 1973 to 1983. He represented the 14th District.

References

Politicians from Milwaukee
People from Wautoma, Wisconsin
1932 births
1999 deaths
20th-century American politicians
Democratic Party members of the Wisconsin State Assembly